Alfonso García (born 1906 in Mexico City - date of death unknown) was a Mexican sprinter who competed in the 1928 Summer Olympics.

References

1906 births
Year of death missing
Mexican male sprinters
Olympic athletes of Mexico
Athletes from Mexico City
Athletes (track and field) at the 1928 Summer Olympics
Central American and Caribbean Games gold medalists for Mexico
Competitors at the 1926 Central American and Caribbean Games
Central American and Caribbean Games medalists in athletics
20th-century Mexican people